Mir Abdul Quddus Bizenjo (born 1 January 1974) is a Pakistani politician who has been serving as the Chief Minister of Balochistan province of Pakistan since 29 October 2021. He has been a member of the Provincial Assembly of Balochistan since November 2002. He is a member of the  Balochistan Awami Party.

Previously, he was a member of the Balochistan Assembly from November 2002 to May 2018. He served as the 16th Chief Minister of Balochistan from 13 January 2018 to 7 June 2018 and served as Deputy Speaker of the Provincial Assembly of Balochistan from 2013 to 2015. He served in the provincial Balochistan cabinet between 2002 and 2013, as the minister of livestock. He has been elected as chief minister of Balochistan on 29 October 2021.

Early life and education
Bizenjo was born on 1 January 1974 in Awaran, Balochistan, Pakistan.

He did his early education from Shindi Jhao, his native town in Awaran District. In 2000, he received a master's degree in English from the University of Balochistan.

Political career
Bizenjo was elected to the Provincial Assembly of Balochistan as a candidate of Pakistan Muslim League (Q) from Constituency PB-41 (Awaran) in 2002 Pakistani general election by securing 9,492 votes. He served as provincial minister of Balochistan for livestock and dairy development in the provincial cabinet of Chief Minister Jam Mohammad Yousaf.

As per the Election Commission of Pakistan, he ran for the seat of Provincial Assembly of Balochistan as a candidate of Pakistan Muslim League (Q) from constituency PB-41 Awaran in 2008 Pakistani general election but was unsuccessful and lost the seat to an independent candidate Mir Qamber Ali Ghicki. He had secured 8,456 votes. '

He was re-elected to the Provincial Assembly of Balochistan as a candidate of Pakistan Muslim League (Q) from constituency PB-41 Awaran in 2013 Pakistani general election. He secured 544 votes in a constituency where there were 57,666 registered voters. Geo News noted Bizenjo was elected to a legislative chamber by getting the fewest votes in the electoral history of the country.

In June 2013, he was elected as deputy speaker of the Provincial Assembly of Balochistan. After Speaker of the Provincial Assembly, Jan Mohammad Jamali resigned from his post in 2015 prior to a vote of no confidence against him, Bizenjo was named as a potential candidate to overtake Jamali as the succeeding Speaker however he could not. After Rahila Durrani was made the new Speaker by Chief Minister Nawab Sanaullah Khan Zehri belonging to ruling Pakistan Muslim League (N) (PML-N), Bizenjo tendered his resignation as the deputy speaker in December 2015.

On 2 January 2018, Bizenjo played a major role in the  ouster of sitting Chief Minister Nawab Sanaullah Khan Zehri, after he along with some members of the Provincial Assembly submitted a motion of no confidence against Chief Minister Nawab Sanaullah Khan Zehri which triggered a political turmoil in the provincial assembly. Bizenjo was supported by dissent MPAs belonging to PML-N which led to the resignation of the Zehri and caused a major setback to PML-N ahead of 2018 Senate election due to be held in March 2018. On 12 January, Bizenjo submitted his nomination paper for the office of chief ministership. Dawn in its editorial termed the election of Bizenjo for the office of chief ministership as "Undemocratic poll", noting how Bizenjo - who received 544 votes in the election - being the weakest candidate for the slot of chief ministership could become the "best" candidate.

On 13 January, Bizenjo was elected as the Chief Minister of Balochistan, securing 41 out of total 65 votes in the assembly including the votes of dissident MPAs of PML-N, a party considered to be the arch rival of PML-Q.

PML-N, which was the largest single party in the assembly with 21 members, failed to nominate its candidate for the post of chief minister. The Express Tribune in its editorial noted  that in a significant move, PML-N "stood dislodged from the government of the province" after governing it for four and half year.

In his maiden speech, Bizenjo promised to make healthcare, education and clean drinking water his top priority during his term as Chief Minister of the Balochistan.

In March 2018, Bizenjo helped form a new political party, Balochistan Awami Party (BAP).

On 7 June 2018, Alauddin Marri was appointed by Election Commission of Pakistan to succeed Bizenjo as caretaker Chief Minister of Balochistan.

He was re-elected to the Provincial Assembly of Balochistan as a candidate of BAP from Constituency PB-44 (Awaran-cum-Panjgur) in 2018 Pakistani general election. He received 8,055 votes and defeated Khair Jan, a candidate of National Party. Following his successful election, he was nominated by BAP for the office of Speaker of the Provincial Assembly of Balochistan. On 16 August 2018, he was elected Speaker of Balochistan Assembly. He received 39 votes against his opponent Muhammad Nawaz Khan Kakar who secured 20 votes.

On 6 September 2018, he became acting governor of Balochistan following the resignation of Muhammad Khan Achakzai.

On 19 November 2018, he announced to resign as speaker of Balochistan Assembly. Later he didn't resign and continued in the office. He resigned as speaker on 25 October 2021.

On 29 October 2021, Bizenjo was elected unopposed as the chief minister of Balochistan.

Hub District 
Hub District is created after bifurcating Lasbela District. Sardar Muhammad Saleh Bhootani confirmed that the creation of Hub District is a long-standing demand of the people of PB-49 constituency. It contains the areas of Hub Tehsil, Winder Tehsil, Gaddani Tehsil, Sakran Tehsil and Dureji Tehsil. MNA Muhammad Aslam Bhootani has thanked Chief Minister Bizenjo for approving the creation of this district.

References

Chief Minister of Balochistan

Living people
1974 births
Balochistan MPAs 2013–2018
Pakistan Muslim League (Q) politicians
Baloch people
People from Awaran District
University of Balochistan alumni
Balochistan Awami Party MPAs (Balochistan)
Chief Ministers of Balochistan, Pakistan